Coleman Chambers Francis (January 24, 1919 – January 15, 1973) was an American actor, writer, producer and director. He was best known for his film trilogy consisting of The Beast of Yucca Flats (1961), The Skydivers (1963) and Red Zone Cuba (1966), all three of which were filmed in the general vicinity of Santa Clarita, California.

Early life

Francis was born in Greer County, Oklahoma in 1919. He was the son of William F. Francis and Scytha Estes. During the Great Depression, he moved to Texas.

Career
In 1940, Francis headed for Hollywood to start an acting career. His plans were initially interrupted by the Second World War, during which he served in the medical detachment of the 49th Field Artillery Battalion, 7th Infantry Division. He played minor parts in several films from the late 1940s to early 1970s, often without credit, including Blondie's Reward, Scarlet Angel, The Girl in White, This Island Earth, She Couldn't Say No, Twilight for the Gods, P. J. and Motorpsycho. 1958 brought his first credited role, Stakeout on Dope Street, where he played a detective. His last notable work in the film industry was in 1970, when he played a drunk in Russ Meyer's Beyond the Valley of the Dolls.

During March 1958, Francis portrayed Matthew Harrison Brady opposite Sidney Blackmer as Henry Drummond in Inherit the Wind at the Sombrero Playhouse in Phoenix, Arizona.

In 1959, Francis formed a partnership with Anthony "Tony" Cardoza, a welder by trade, and together they created three films: The Beast of Yucca Flats (1961), The Skydivers (1963) and Red Zone Cuba (1966). Francis wrote and directed the films, while Cardoza handled production duties.

Personal life
Francis married Barbara Francis, and while the two had divorced prior to the filming of The Beast of Yucca Flats, she was cast as Lois Radcliffe in Beast and appeared as the wife of a spectator (played by Coleman) in its follow-up, The Skydivers. They had two sons, Alan and Ronald, who appeared as Art and Randy Radcliffe in The Beast of Yucca Flats and the spectator's sons in The Skydivers.

Death
Francis died in California on January 15, 1973, at the age of 53. Though arteriosclerosis is listed as the official cause of death, Cardoza says Francis' body was found in the back of a station wagon at the Vine Street Ranch Market with "a plastic bag over his head and a tube going into his mouth or around his throat". Francis is interred at the Columbarium of Remembrance in the Westwood Village Memorial Park Cemetery in Los Angeles.

Legacy
After fading into obscurity for decades, Francis' three directed films gained cult status after being featured on Mystery Science Theater 3000 in the mid-1990s, where they became infamous for their poor production values, repetitive plot devices, meandering and incomprehensible storylines, and stilted acting. Some critics have characterized Francis as being the worst director of all-time, even suggesting that he may surpass Ed Wood in terms of ineptitude. Hallmarks of Francis' films include preoccupation with light aircraft and parachuting, coffee or cigarettes serving as props or centers of conversation and vigilante-style gunning down of suspects without trial at the films' conclusions.

Filmography

Actor (films)
 Blondie's Reward (uncredited, 1948)
 The Girl in White (1952)
 Scarlet Angel (uncredited, 1952)
 Killers from Space (uncredited, 1954)
 She Couldn't Say No (uncredited, 1954)
 This Island Earth (uncredited, 1955)
 The Phantom Stagecoach (uncredited, 1957)
 Stakeout on Dope Street (1958)
 Twilight for the Gods (uncredited, 1958)
 T-Bird Gang (1959)
 The Jailbreakers (1960)
 Spring Affair (1960)
 Cimarron (uncredited, 1960)
 The Beast of Yucca Flats (uncredited, 1961)
 The Skydivers (uncredited, 1963)
 The Thrill Killers (uncredited, 1964)
 Lemon Grove Kids Meet the Monsters (1965)
 Motorpsycho (1965)
 Red Zone Cuba (1966)
 The Last American Hobo (1967)
 P.J. (uncredited, 1968)
 Body Fever (1969)
 The Dirtiest Game (1970)
 Beyond the Valley of the Dolls (1970)

Actor (television)
 Sergeant Preston of the Yukon (4 episodes, 1955–1957)
 Highway Patrol (1 episode, 1959)
 Dragnet (3 episodes, 1957–1959)
 M Squad (1 episode, 1960)
 Tales of Wells Fargo (1 episode, 1961)

Director
 The Beast of Yucca Flats (1961)
 The Skydivers (1963)
 Night Train to Mundo Fine (aka Red Zone Cuba) (1966)

See also

List of films considered the worst
RiffTrax
Social realism

References

External links
 
 Interview with Anthony Cardoza
 

1919 births
1973 deaths
American male film actors
American male television actors
Burials at Westwood Village Memorial Park Cemetery
20th-century American male actors
Film directors from California
Film directors from Oklahoma
People from Greer County, Oklahoma